Bill Raidler, known as "Little Bill" Raidler ( - 1904) was an American outlaw of the Old West, and member of the Doolin-Dalton gang.

Raidler was born William F. Raidler in Pennsylvania, and raised to be an educated man. However he had an adventurous side, and drifted down to Texas where he became a cowboy, then eventually ventured up to Oklahoma Territory, where he met Bill Doolin. He joined Doolin's gang around 1892. He was involved in numerous bank robberies and train robberies, as well as a number of shootouts with lawmen. On September 6, 1895, Raidler was trailed to a hideout in Oklahoma by Deputy US Marshal Bill Tilghman. Raidler engaged Tilghman and his two deputies in a gunbattle, and was shot in the wrist by Tilghman. As he attempted to flee, Tilghman shot him two more times, once in the back and once in the neck. Raidler survived, and was sentenced to ten years in prison. He was released in ill health in 1903, suffering greatly from his gunshot wounds that never completely healed. He died a year later. At the time of his death, he was one of only two surviving members of the Wild Bunch gang, as well as one of only two members who survived into the twentieth century. Roy Dougherty, the last surviving member, outlived him by 20 years.

External links
"Little Bill" Raidler

American bank robbers
Criminals from Pennsylvania
Cowboys
Deaths by firearm in Oklahoma
Outlaws of the American Old West
People of Indian Territory
People shot dead by law enforcement officers in the United States
Year of birth missing